Lee Raymond Askham (born 25 February 1990) is an English footballer who played for Chesterfield in League Two during the 2008–09 season.

Career

Club career
Beginning as an apprentice at Sheffield United, Askham was released in May 2008, and had a trial at Manchester United in September of the same year. He signed for Chesterfield three months later on a one-month contract, which was extended to the end of the season in January 2009. He was sent out on loan to Garforth Town in March 2009, but returned to Chesterfield in May. He made his Chesterfield debut on 2 May 2009, coming on as a 70th-minute substitute for Scott Boden in a 2–0 home defeat by Bradford City. However, after just six months with the Spireites, he was released.

Askham joined Northern Premier League Premier Division club Guiseley in September 2009.

International career
Askham represented England at under-17 level.

References

External links

Profile at Sheffield United F.C. official website
Profile at Chesterfield F.C. official website
England profile at the FA

1990 births
Living people
People from Killamarsh
Footballers from Derbyshire
English footballers
Sheffield United F.C. players
Chesterfield F.C. players
Guiseley A.F.C. players
English Football League players
Association football midfielders